Lourdes Yaurimar Moreno Beleno (born 25 January 1997), better known as Kika Moreno, is a Venezuelan footballer who plays as a midfielder for Venezuela women's national team.

References

External links 
Kika Moreno at BDFútbol

1997 births
Living people
People from Barinas (state)
Venezuelan women's footballers
Women's association football midfielders
Deportivo de La Coruña (women) players
EdF Logroño players
Primera División (women) players
Segunda Federación (women) players
Venezuela women's international footballers
Competitors at the 2014 Central American and Caribbean Games
Venezuelan expatriate women's footballers
Venezuelan expatriate sportspeople in Spain
Expatriate women's footballers in Spain